The 2017 Southern Utah Thunderbirds volleyball team will represent Southern Utah University in the 2017 NCAA Division I women's volleyball season. The Thunderbirds are led by third year head coach Craig Choate and play their home games at Centrum Arena. The Thunderbirds are members of the Big Sky.

Southern Utah comes off a season where they finished 2–14 in conference, 4–24 overall, good for sixth place in the South Division and tied for 11th overall. For 2017 the Thunderbirds were picked to finish sixth in the South, 12th overall, in the pre-season Big Sky poll.

Season highlights 
Season highlights will be filled in as the season progresses.

Roster

Schedule 

 *-Indicates Conference Opponent
 y-Indicates NCAA Playoffs
 Times listed are Mountain Time Zone.

Announcers for televised games 
All home games will be on the Pluto TV Ch. 236. Select road games will also be televised or streamed.

 Charlotte: Sean Fox
 Utah Valley: Bryson Lester
 Air Force: Jason Carter & George Egan
 Air Force: Jason Carter & George Egan
 Utah State: No commentary
 North Dakota: Bryson Lester
 Northern Arizona: Bryson Lester
 Weber State: Kylee Young
 Idaho State: Cade Vance & Matt Steuart
 Idaho: Bryson Lester
 Eastern Washington: Bryson Lester
 Sacramento State:
 Portland State:
 Montana:
 Montana State:
 Portland State: Bryson Lester
 Sacramento State: Bryson Lester
 Idaho State: Bryson Lester
 Weber State: Bryson Lester
 Northern Colorado:
 Northern Arizona:

References 

2017 in sports in Utah
Southern Utah